Memorial Stadium is a 5,000 capacity county owned multi-purpose stadium near Savannah, Georgia. The stadium is primarily used for American football by high schools in Chatham County.

The facility is dedicated to Georgians who died at war.

The stadium was modernized in 2018, reopening in September 2018.

References

External links
Information at Chatham Co. Government

High school football venues in the United States
Soccer venues in Georgia (U.S. state)
Sports venues in Georgia (U.S. state)
Multi-purpose stadiums in the United States
American football venues in Georgia (U.S. state)